The 2018–19 Wake Forest Demon Deacons men's basketball team represented Wake Forest University during the 2018–19 NCAA Division I men's basketball season. The Demon Deacons were led by fifth-year head coach Danny Manning and played their home games at the Lawrence Joel Veterans Memorial Coliseum in Winston-Salem, North Carolina as members of the Atlantic Coast Conference.

Previous season
The Demon Deacons finished 2017–18 season 11–20, 4–14 in ACC play to finish in 14th place. They lost in the first round of the ACC tournament to Syracuse.

Offseason

Departures

Incoming Transfers

2018 recruiting class

Roster

Schedule and results

Source:

|-
!colspan=12 style=| Exhibition

|-
!colspan=12 style=| Non-conference regular season

|-
!colspan=12 style=| ACC regular season

|-
!colspan=12 style=| ACC tournament

References

Wake Forest Demon Deacons men's basketball seasons
Wake Forest